Arielle St. Cyr Vandenberg (born September 27, 1986) is an American actress, television host and model.

She is best known as the host of the American version of the British reality show Love Island, which premiered in July 2019 on CBS through to its third season in 2021.

Early life
Vandenberg was born on September 27, 1986, in Los Angeles County, California, the only child of Dirk and DeEtte Vandenberg. She was raised in Fallbrook, California, and graduated from Fallbrook Union High School. She studied ballet, tap and jazz dancing at the age of five, and later became involved in community theater.

Career
Vandenberg guest-starred in the first two seasons of Meet the Browns as London Sheraton, and had a recurring guest role in Greek as Lisa Lawson. She has made once-off appearances in other television series including CSI: Miami, Bones, How I Met Your Mother and Numbers, and has appeared in non-speaking roles in films including Epic Movie and The Ugly Truth. She has starred in several television commercials for brands including Mercedes-Benz, Coca-Cola Zero, State Farm Insurance, and Progressive Auto Insurance. In 2013, Vandenberg appeared in the music video for the single "R U Mine?" by Arctic Monkeys.

Vandenberg had a large following on Twitter's video service Vine prior to its closure in 2017.

In June 2019, Vandenberg was announced as the host of the reality show Love Island USA, which premiered in July 2019 on CBS.
She hosted three seasons of it until CBS did not renew the show for a fourth season and was picked up by streaming service Peacock and was replaced by actress Sarah Hyland.

Personal life
As of September 2019, Vandenberg has been engaged to fellow Vine star Matt Cutshall. She previously dated Arctic Monkeys frontman Alex Turner for three years from 2011 to 2014. She dated actor Will Arnett in 2015.

Filmography

References

External links

1986 births
American television actresses
American people of German descent
American people of Welsh descent
American people of English descent
American people of Italian descent
American people of Irish descent
American people of French descent
American people of Dutch descent
Living people
Female models from California
People from Los Angeles County, California
21st-century American women